Cychrus ivanrapuzzii is a species of ground beetle in the subfamily of Carabinae. It was described by Cavazzuti in 2007.

References

ivanrapuzzii
Beetles described in 2007